Mohamed Halim (born January 2, 1977) is an Egyptian retired football midfielder. He currently manages El Qanah in the Egyptian Second Division.

Honours
Egypt Cup: 2008–09, 2009–10
Egyptian Super Cup: 2009

Managerial statistics

Living people
1977 births
Egyptian footballers
Haras El Hodoud SC players
Association football midfielders
Haras El Hodoud SC managers